Richard Bloch  (1926–2004) was an American entrepreneur and philanthropist, founder of H&R Block.

Richard Bloch may also refer to:
Richard Milton Bloch  (1921–2000), American computer programmer
Richard L. Bloch (1929–2018), American businessman